Roseburia hominis is a bacterium first isolated from human feces. It is anaerobic, Gram-negative or Gram-variable, slightly curved rod-shaped and motile. The cells range in size from 0.5-1.5 to 5.0 μm.  A2-183(T) (=DSM 16839(T)=NCIMB 14029(T)) is the type strain.

It is being studied as a potential treatment for ulcerative colitis in pediatric patients ages 0 through 16 years.

References

Further reading
Staley, James T., et al. "Bergey's manual of systematic bacteriology, vol. 3."Williams and Wilkins, Baltimore, MD (1989): 2250–2251.

External links
Roseburia, LPSN

Type strain of Roseburia hominis at BacDive -  the Bacterial Diversity Metadatabase

Lachnospiraceae
Bacteria described in 2006